Two ships of Tirrenia di Navigazione have been named Lazio:

 , in service 1953–67
 MV Lazio (1993), in service since 1994

Ship names